In enzymology, an UDP-N-acetylglucosamine—lysosomal-enzyme N-acetylglucosaminephosphotransferase is an enzyme that catalyzes the chemical reaction

UDP-N-acetyl-D-glucosamine + lysosomal-enzyme D-mannose  UMP + lysosomal-enzyme N-acetyl-D-glucosaminyl-phospho-D-mannose

Thus, the two substrates of this enzyme are UDP-N-acetyl-D-glucosamine and lysosomal-enzyme D-mannose, whereas its two products are UMP and lysosomal-enzyme N-acetyl-D-glucosaminyl-phospho-D-mannose.

This enzyme belongs to the family of transferases, specifically those transferring phosphorus-containing groups transferases for other substituted phosphate groups.  The systematic name of this enzyme class is UDP-N-acetyl-D-glucosamine:lysosomal-enzyme N-acetylglucosaminephosphotransferase.  Other names in common use include UDP-N-acetylglucosamine:lysosomal enzyme N-acetylglucosamine-1-phosphotransferase, UDP-GlcNAc:glycoprotein N-acetylglucosamine-1-phosphotransferase, uridine diphosphoacetylglucosamine-lysosomal enzyme precursor acetylglucosamine-1-phosphotransferase, uridine diphosphoacetylglucosamine-glycoprotein acetylglucosamine-1-phosphotransferase, lysosomal enzyme precursor acetylglucosamine-1-phosphotransferase, UDP-acetylglucosamine:lysosomal enzyme N-acetylglucosamine-1-phosphotransferase, UDP-GlcNAc:lysosomal enzyme N-acetylglucosamine-1-phosphotransferase, UDP-N-acetylglucosamine:glycoprotein N-acetylglucosamine-1-phosphotransferase, and UDP-N-acetylglucosamine:glycoprotein N-acetylglucosaminyl-1-phosphotransferase.

References

 
 
 
 

EC 2.7.8
Enzymes of unknown structure